The Monument in Memory of Chinese from Tiananmen, also known as the Monument of the Victims of the Tiananmen Square Pacification, is a monument in Wrocław, Poland at Oławska Street. It commemorates the 1989 Tiananmen Square protests in Beijing and the victims of following massacre in which People's Liberation Army troops armed with assault rifles and accompanied by tanks fired at the demonstrators and those trying to block the military's advance into Tiananmen Square. The monument was first created by Igor Wójcik, Robert Jezierski and Joanna Czarnecka in 1989 and was later recreated by Marek Stanielewicz after the original monument was destroyed by the Security Service.

History 
The monument was created by Igor Wójcik, Robert Jezierski, Joanna Czarneckain 1989 during the demonstration by oppositionist group in Wrocław that followed the events of Tiananmen Square Massacre of June 4. It was revealed at the end of the demonstration and destroyed the following day by Security Service. It was recreated ten years later by Marek Stanielewicz.

Description 
The monument is a paved square plate on which lies a run over bike. The trace of tank continuous track goes through the pavement. It is located in Wrocław, Poland at Oławska Street, on the small lawn near the pavement. The monument is under the administration of Road Management and Maintenance of the City of Wrocław.

Notes

References 

Buildings and structures in Wrocław
1998 sculptures
1999 sculptures
1998 establishments in Poland
1999 establishments in Poland
Monuments and memorials in Poland
Outdoor sculptures in Poland
1989 Tiananmen Square protests and massacre